Karl Ebbe Bergh (9 March 1883 – 9 May 1954) was a Swedish track and field athlete who competed in the 1912 Summer Olympics. He was born in Härnösand and died in Gudmundrå, Västernorrland County. In 1912 he finished seventh in the standing high jump event and 18th in the standing long jump competition.

References

External links
profile

1883 births
1954 deaths
Swedish male high jumpers
Swedish male long jumpers
Olympic athletes of Sweden
Athletes (track and field) at the 1912 Summer Olympics
People from Härnösand
Sportspeople from Västernorrland County
20th-century Swedish people